Patrick John O'Connell (4 September 1888 – 7 April 1980) was an Irish Gaelic footballer who played for Cork Senior Championship club Nils. He played for the Cork senior football team for six seasons, during which time he usually lined out as a right corner-forward.

Honours

Nils
Cork Senior Football Championship (2): 1915, 1917

Cork
All-Ireland Senior Football Championship (1): 1911
Munster Senior Football Championship (2): 1911, 1916

References

1888 births
1980 deaths
Nils Gaelic footballers
Cork inter-county Gaelic footballers
Winners of one All-Ireland medal (Gaelic football)